This is a list of airports in New Caledonia, sorted by location.

New Caledonia is an overseas territory (territoire d'outre-mer or TOM) of France, made up of a main island (Grande Terre) and several smaller islands. It is located in the region of Melanesia in the southwest Pacific.



Airports 

ICAO location identifiers are linked to each airport's Aeronautical Information Publication (AIP), which are available online in Portable Document Format (PDF) from the French Service d'information aéronautique (SIA). Locations shown in bold are as per the airport's AIP page. Most airports give two locations: the first is the city served, second is the city where the airport is located.

Airport names shown in bold indicate the airport has scheduled service on commercial airlines.

See also 
 Transport in New Caledonia
 List of airports in France
 List of airports by ICAO code: N#NW - New Caledonia
 Wikipedia: Airline destination lists: Oceania#New Caledonia (France)

References 
 Aeronautical Information Service / Service d'information aéronautique (SIA) 
 Aeronautical Information Publications (AIP) 
 Union des Aéroports Français 
 
  - includes IATA codes
 Great Circle Mapper: Airports in New Caledonia - IATA and ICAO codes
 World Aero Data: Airports in New Caledonia - ICAO codes

New Caledonia
 
Airports
New Caledonia
New Caledonia